No Sleep 'till Bedtime is a live album by Canadian extreme metal band Strapping Young Lad. It was recorded live in Melbourne Australia, on October 12, 1997; however, the live tracks presented here are the only ones recorded before the tape ran out. "Japan" and "Centipede" are new studio tracks that were added by the label as a bonus material. The title is a homage to and parody of Motörhead's No Sleep 'til Hammersmith live album.

"Japan" and "Centipede" are studio recordings, each a Japanese bonus track for Heavy as a Really Heavy Thing and City respectively. The latter samples a percussion loop from "Happiness in Slavery" by Nine Inch Nails.

The Japanese release of this record came in a limited edition box set. It includes four bonus tracks that are demos recorded at one of vocalist/guitarist Devin Townsend's friend's living rooms in LA, which were later added to the 2007 reissue of City.

Track listing

Personnel
Devin Townsend – vocals, guitar
Jed Simon – guitar, backing vocals
Byron Stroud – bass, backing vocals
John Morgan – keyboards
Gene Hoglan – drums

References

Strapping Young Lad live albums
1998 live albums
Century Media Records live albums
Albums produced by Devin Townsend